William Walsh (May 11, 1828 – May 17, 1892) was a U.S. Congressman from the sixth district of Maryland, serving two terms from 1875 until 1879.

Born near Tullamore, Ireland, Walsh emigrated to the United States in 1842 and settled in Virginia.  He graduated from Mount St. Mary's College of Emmitsburg, Maryland, and began studying law.  He was admitted to the bar in Virginia in 1850, and commenced practice in Cumberland, Maryland in 1852.

Walsh served as a member of the Maryland Constitutional convention in 1867, and was later elected as a Democrat to the Forty-fourth and Forty-fifth Congresses (serving from March 4, 1875, until March 3, 1879).  In Congress, he served as chairman of the Committee on Revision of the Laws (Forty-fifth Congress), but declined to be a candidate for renomination in 1878.  He resumed the practice of law afterwards, and died in Cumberland in 1892.  Walsh is interred in St. Patrick's Cemetery.

External links 

1828 births
1892 deaths
19th-century American politicians
19th-century Irish people
Democratic Party members of the United States House of Representatives from Maryland
Irish emigrants to the United States (before 1923)
Maryland lawyers
Mount St. Mary's University alumni
Lawyers from Cumberland, Maryland
People from Tullamore, County Offaly
Politicians from County Offaly
19th-century American lawyers
Politicians from Cumberland, Maryland